Dreamlovers is the eleventh studio album by American country music artist Tanya Tucker. It was released on September 29, 1980, by MCA Records. The album features two duets with Glen Campbell, "My Song" and "Dream Lover", a song written and originally sung by Bobby Darin in 1959, which was released as a single. It peaked at only #59 on the Billboard Country Singles chart. The biggest hit single from the album was "Can I See You Tonight," which peaked at #4. Another charting single was the #40 "Love Knows We Tried."  The album itself peaked at #41 on the Country Albums chart.

Track listing

Personnel
Tanya Tucker, Glen Campbell - vocals
Steve Hardin, Steve Goldstein, Bobby Wood - keyboards
Jerry Swallow, Jon Goin, Pete Wade, Johnny Christopher - guitar
Bill McCubbin, Jack Williams, Joe Osborn, Neil Stubenhaus - bass guitar
Steve Turner, Buster Phillips, Jerry Carrigan - drums
Tanya Tucker, Glen Campbell, Mel Tillis, Sheri Kramer, Bergen White, Diane Tidwell - backing vocals

Production
Producer - Jerry Crutchfield
Engineers - Brent Mather, Rick McCollister
Photography - Allen Messer
Art Direction - George Osaki
Design - Marilyn Romen/Sweet Art
Mastered by Hank Williams at Woodland Sound Studios, Nashville, TN
Vocal overdubs - MCA-Whitney, Glendale, CA

Chart performance

Album

Singles

References

1980 albums
Tanya Tucker albums
MCA Records albums
Albums produced by Jerry Crutchfield